Kenny de Schepper was the defending champion, but lost to Nicolas Mahut in the final 6–3, 7–6(7–3).

Seeds

Draw

Finals

Top half

Bottom half

References
 Main Draw
 Qualifying Draw

Open de Rennes - Singles
2013 Singles